Fuzhounese Americans, also known as Hokchew Americans or Fuzhou Americans or imprecisely Fujianese, are Chinese American people of Fuzhou descent, in particular from the Changle district. Many Chinese restaurant workers in the United States are from Fuzhou. There are also a number of undocumented Fuzhounese immigrants in the United States who are smuggled in by groups such as snakeheads. 

Fuzhounese Americans helped develop the Chinatown bus lines system, which originated as a means to transport restaurant workers from New York City to various parts of the northeastern United States. 

Unlike other Chinese Americans and Asian American groups, Fuzhounese Americans are almost completely concentrated in the U.S. Northeast. The vast majority live in New York City and on Long Island, but some also live in Middlesex and Morris counties in New Jersey; and in the Boston and Philadelphia metropolitan areas.

Immigration
After the lifting of emigration restriction in the 1980s, people began leaving the Fuzhou area. Illegal immigration from Fujian province peaked at around 8,000 per month in June 1992. During the second half of 1992, illegal immigration into the US was about 2500 per month. Migrants were mostly men, but in 1992 around 20–30% of them were women and children. These arrivals were mostly unskilled agricultural workers. About 80% of them were from the Changle District of Fuzhou, with smaller numbers from Lianjiang and Minhou counties, and other places.

Businesses

Restaurants
Many Chinese restaurant owners and workers are from Fuzhou. The Chinatown buses system originated as a means to transport workers from New York City to various parts of the East Coast, Midwest, and also parts of the southeastern United States. Restaurant owners usually adopted the established American Chinese cuisine, which is somewhat based on Cantonese cuisine, rather than serving Fujian cuisine. These restaurants are usually all-you-can-eat buffets and take-out restaurants.

Other
Many Fuzhounese people also work in the Chinatown garment industry. With time, however, the Fuzhounese population has become upwardly mobile in socioeconomic status. Second-generation Fuzhounese have high rates of educational attainment and often work in professional occupations like tech and finance.

Locations
Hokchiu people in the US are almost singularly concentrated in the New York metropolitan area, unlike other Chinese Americans and Asian American groups. The number of Fuzhounese in New York City and nationwide is notably difficult to enumerate precisely, since as many as 50% of Fuzhounese immigrants are undocumented and may be reluctant to respond to census-takers. One estimate put the number of Fuzhou people in New York City at over 70,000; however, Einhorn in 1994 estimated that as many as 100,000 Fujianese were living in New York at the time, and that an additional 10,000 were arriving each year. Data from the 2005–2009 American Community Survey suggests there are around 1,450 Fuzhou speakers in the United States, although the number is likely to be far greater as most respondents simply wrote "Chinese".

New York City

Manhattan's Chinatown and Lower East Side
During the 1980s, growing numbers of Fuzhou immigrants started arriving into Manhattan's Chinatown. Because Manhattan's Chinatown was mostly Cantonese-speaking, many could not integrate well there. Instead they began to settle on East Broadway and east of The Bowery, which was not fully developed as part of Chinatown but an overlapping enclave of Chinese, Latinos and Jewish populations. Many of the earlier Fuzhou immigrants learned to speak Cantonese to find work and to interact with most of Chinatown's residents. Many of the earlier Fuzhou immigrants to New York lived in Hong Kong for some time, adapting to the Hong Kong culture and learning to speak Cantonese.  The Little Fuzhou enclave slowly emerged on the eastern borderline of Chinatown, which was still overlapped with some Latino and Jewish populations. It eventually became fully Chinese-populated and fully part of Manhattan's Chinatown. However, Chinatown became subdivided into the older established Cantonese Chinatown, in the western portion, and the newer Fuzhou Chinatown in the eastern portion. Some longtime Cantonese residents (many of them older generations) and businesses remain in Fuzhou Chinatown. 

Hokchiu people have founded business organizations such as the Fuzhou-American Chamber of Commerce and Industry. In 1998, businesspeople from Changle founded the Changle American Association, which has become one of the most influential community organizations.

Shift to Brooklyn, Queens, and Nassau County
However, due to the gentrification situation of Manhattan's Chinatown since the 2000s, the Chinese population and businesses are declining and moving from the original Chinatown to newer Chinatowns in New York, and the Fuzhou immigrants are also part of this decline as well. Many of Chinese in Manhattan's Chinatown are relocating to the newer Chinese enclaves in Brooklyn, Queens, and Nassau County. However, the Fuzhous that are moving out are mostly relocating to Sunset Park, which now has the largest Fuzhou community in all of New York City, while the Cantonese are moving to Bensonhurst, Brooklyn's newer and growing Chinese enclaves, which are more primarily Cantonese populated.

Brooklyn's Sunset Park Chinatown 
Like Manhattan's Chinatown in the past, Brooklyn's Sunset Park Chinatown was primarily Cantonese, but was much smaller and less developed unlike Manhattan's Chinatown, which already had been very large and developed. With the gentrification and lack of available apartment units in Manhattan's Chinatown that came in the 2000s, the growing Fuzhou population shifted to Brooklyn's Sunset Park Chinatown to seek affordable housing and jobs. The shift of the Fuzhou immigration to Brooklyn's Sunset Park Chinatown dramatically expanded the Chinese enclave so prominently that it is now overwhelmingly Fuzhou populated and has far surpassed the size of the Fuzhou enclave in Manhattan's Chinatown. In addition, the Brooklyn Sunset Park Chinatown has overall surpassed the size of Manhattan's Chinatown. Unlike in Brooklyn's Sunset Park Chinatown, where the Fuzhou population has managed to dominate the whole enclave and still quickly growing, the Fuzhou enclave in Manhattan's Chinatown only managed to occupy the eastern portion while the western portion of Manhattan's Chinatown still remains primarily Cantonese.

Population

Political views
Compared to previous Chinese immigrants, Fuzhou Americans tend to have a more favorable view of the People's Republic of China. 

While the majority of the Fuzhou population in the US came directly from Fuzhou, some Fuzhou Americans have also descended from Matsu, Fukien Province, R.O.C. and the Hokchiu (Foochowese) diaspora in Southeast Asia, particularly Malaysia and Singapore.

"Left behind" children
Some Fuzhounese people give birth to children in the US, then send their young children back to their hometowns because they are unable to raise them and work at the same time. Because of jus soli laws these children automatically gain American citizenship. These children are called "left-behind Americans" and are usually cared for by grandparents. They are reunited with their parents in the US once they have reached the age to attend grade school.

Notable people

 Jeffrey Yi-Lin Forrest (1959–), professor of mathematics, systems science, economics, and finance at Pennsylvania State System of Higher Education (Slippery Rock campus)
 Lin Chen, founder of Summit Import Corporation, one of the largest importers of Asian food on the East Coast
 Tung-Yen Lin (林同棪 1912–2003), structural engineer who pioneered the use of prestressed concrete
 Lin Yaohua (1910–2000), leading Chinese sociologist and anthropologist
 Maya Lin (October 5, 1959–), designer and artist known for her work in sculpture and land art; designer of the Vietnam Veterans Memorial
 Wang Shizhen (王世真; 1916–2016), Chinese nuclear medicine physician and academician of the Chinese Academy of Sciences (CAS), known as the "father of Chinese nuclear medicine"
 Victims of the Chen family homicides
 Wang Wenxing (王文興 1939–), Taiwanese writer
 Hsien Wu (吳憲 1893–1959), Chinese protein scientist
 Zhang Yuzhe (1902–1986), astronomer widely regarded as the "father of modern Chinese astronomy"

See also

 Little Fuzhou (小福州)
 Fuzhou Town (福州埠), Brooklyn (布鲁克林)
 Chinese emigration
 Golden Venture, ship that smuggled 286 undocumented immigrants from China (mostly Fuzhou people from Fujian province) that ran aground on the beach at Fort Tilden in Rockaway Beach in Queens in 1993
 Asian Americans in New York City
 Bangladeshis in New York City
 Chinese people in New York City
 Demographics of New York City
 Filipinos in the New York metropolitan area
 Indians in the New York City metropolitan region
 Japanese in New York City
 Koreans in New York City
 Russians in New York City
 Taiwanese people in New York City
 The Leavers, novel by Lisa Ko about undocumented immigrants from Fuzhou

References

Chinese American
Chinese-American culture in New York City
Chinatown, Manhattan
Brooklyn